The Cliff Theater is a movie theater and community center in Wray, Colorado.  It was opened in 1950.  In 2013, it was listed in the National Register of Historic Places.

References 

Buildings and structures in Yuma County, Colorado
Theatres on the National Register of Historic Places in Colorado
National Register of Historic Places in Yuma County, Colorado